Ochrosia fatuhivensis is a species of plant in the family Apocynaceae. It is endemic to Fatu Hiva in Marquesas Islands of French Polynesia.

References

fatuhivensis
Flora of the Marquesas Islands
Flora of French Polynesia
Taxonomy articles created by Polbot

Critically endangered flora of Oceania